Dogs' Feast is a 1990 Soviet drama film directed by Leonid Menaker.

Plot 
Drunk, downcast Zhanna, dreams of finding a prince, starting a new life. On New Year's Eve, at the train station, where she works as a cleaner, she meets Arkady, sitting dejectedly at the station. Boredom brings him home, and then it turns out that Arkady does not drink. He doesn't drink, and the reason is in his past. This is followed by the usual pictures of permanent alcoholism for Zhanna. Arkady in all these scenes shows the features of a mysterious man from nowhere, holding himself with unprecedented dignity and refusing alcohol. Zhanna also retains something human in her eyes, despite constant swearing and drunkenness. Everything becomes clear when they visited Leningrad together. There Arkady  a former alcoholic and hard worker, who was in prison for a fight - learns that his wife and children have abandoned him. He gets drunk, and Zhanna carefully takes him back and begins to nurse him. In the end, desperate and realizing that Arkady had not discovered her inner world, did not see in her a person capable of love and compassion, she turned on the gas before lying down next to him.

Cast 
 Natalya Gundareva as Zhanna
 Sergey Shakurov as Arkady Petrovich
 Larisa Udovichenko as Alexandra
 Anna Polikarpova as Natasha
 Christina Denga as Christina
 Lyudmila Aleksandrova as Katya, Natasha's mother
 Valentina Pugacheva  as neighbor
 Viktor Bychkov as Vityok, Jeanne's neighbor
 Nikolay Dik as policeman
 Galina Saburova as Maria Grigorievna

References

External links 
 

1990 films
Films directed by Leonid Menaker
1990s Russian-language films
Soviet drama films
1990 drama films
Lenfilm films
Films about alcoholism
Films shot in Russia